James "Jim" Lepowsky (born July 5, 1944, in New York City) is a professor of mathematics at Rutgers University, New Jersey. Previously he taught at Yale University. He received his Ph.D. from M.I.T. in 1970 where his advisors were Bertram Kostant and Sigurdur Helgason. Lepowsky graduated from Stuyvesant High School in 1961, 16 years after Kostant.   His current research is in the areas of infinite-dimensional Lie algebras and vertex algebras. He has written several books on vertex algebras and related topics. In 1988, in a joint work with Igor Frenkel and Arne Meurman, he constructed the monster vertex algebra (also known as the Moonshine module). His PhD students include Stefano Capparelli, Yi-Zhi Huang, Haisheng Li, Arne Meurman, and Antun Milas.

In 2012, he became a fellow of the American Mathematical Society.

Notes

References
 Igor Frenkel, James Lepowsky, Arne Meurman, "Vertex operator algebras and the Monster". Pure and Applied Mathematics, 134.  Academic Press, Inc., Boston, MA, 1988. liv+508 pp. 
 Haisheng Li, James Lepowsky, "Introduction To Vertex Operator Algebras And Their Representations ". "Progress in Mathematics." Birkhauser, 2004.

External links
 

Stuyvesant High School alumni
Massachusetts Institute of Technology alumni
Rutgers University faculty
Fellows of the American Mathematical Society
20th-century American mathematicians
21st-century American mathematicians
1944 births
Living people
Mathematicians from New York (state)